Abhilash Mallick (born 21 November 1991) is an Indian cricketer. He made his List A debut on 27 February 2014, for Odisha in the 2013–14 Vijay Hazare Trophy. He was the captain of Odisha cricket team for the 2014–15 Ranji Trophy Season. In first class cricket, he played for Odisha in Ranji Trophy.

References

External links
 
 

People from Cuttack
Indian cricketers
Odisha cricketers
1991 births
Living people
Cricketers from Odisha